Nachum Eisenstein is the rabbi of the Ma'alot Dafna neighborhood, Jerusalem, Israel. He is one of Rabbi Yosef Shalom Eliashiv's foremost disciples.

American-born Eisenstein heads the International Rabbinical Committee on Conversion. The committee was originally started by Rabbi Chaim Kreiswirth, Chief Rabbi of Antwerp, Belgium. Eisenstein is an advocate for creating halachic standards in determining the status of a conversion to Judaism.

References

Year of birth missing (living people)
Living people
Haredi rabbis in Israel
American Haredi rabbis
Rabbis in Jerusalem
20th-century American rabbis
21st-century American Jews